I Know About You is the second studio album by American indie rock duo Ida, released in 1996 on Simple Machines Records.

Reception 

"Subtle, gentle and picturesque...consistently memorable" – CMJ New Music Report
"gentle, understated but fully inhabited" – Trouser Press
"sparse and beautifully produced" – Roll Magazine 
"I...played it practically daily for...several months." – PopMatters
"the best Ida album" – The Village Voice 
"No one has harmonies as beautiful as Ida. The voices of Liz (Mitchell) and Dan (Littleton) are the prettiest in all the land." – The Chicago Tribune

Track listing
All songs written by Ida, except "When I Was Now" by Cindy Kallet, originally from her album Cindy Kallet 2.

"Little Things" – 4:20
"Back Burner" – 4:52
"Tellings" – 4:26
"Thank You" – 4:34
"Downtown" – 4:44
"Treasure Chest" – 5:36
"Requator" – 4:35
"When I Was Now" – 3:15
"August Again" – 4:41
"Plans" – 4:58
"95 North" – 4:46
"Goodnight" – 3:33

Personnel
 Elizabeth Mitchell - Vocals, Guitar
 Daniel Littleton - Vocals, Guitar, Piano
 Michael Littleton - Drums
 Rose Thomson - Bass
 Rick Lassister - Stand up bass, string arrangements
 Cecilia Littleton Bonner - Viola, Violin

References 

1996 albums
Ida (band) albums